BK Opava is a Czech professional basketball club based in the historical city of Opava. The club was founded in 1945 and currently plays in the NBL.

The club has won the Czech National Basketball League four times – most recently in the 2002–03 season. It also has won six Czech Cup titles, the most recent one being in 2022.

The club plays its home games at the Hala Opava, which has a capacity of 3,006 people.

History
Opava had its glory years in the 00s, as the team won the Czech championship in 1997, 1998, 2002 and 2003. The team also won five Czech Cup titles, including three straight from 1997 until 1999. In the 2017–18 season, Opava reached the finals of the NBL season. By achieving this, the club qualified for the regular season of the 2018–19 Basketball Champions League season.

Name through history
1945–1995 BC Opava
1995–1996 ICEC Opava Basketbal
1996–1997 ICEC Opava
1997–2000 BC Slovnaft Opava
2000–2008 BC Opava
2008–2012 BC Breda & Weinstein Opava
2012–present    BC Opava

Honours

Domestic competitions
Czech Republic Championship:
Winners (4): 1996–97, 1997–98, 2001–02, 2002–03
Runners-up (1): 2017–18
Czech Republic Cup:
Winners (6): 1996–97, 1997–98, 1998–99, 2000–01, 2002–03, 2021–22

Players

Current roster

Season by season

References

External links
Official website
Eurobasket.com BK Opava Page

Basketball teams in the Czech Republic